Valerie Smith (born February 19, 1956) is an American academic administrator, professor, and scholar of African-American literature and culture. She is the 15th and current president of Swarthmore College.

Born and raised in Brooklyn, New York, she is a graduate of Bates College and the University of Virginia. She taught at Princeton University from 1980 to 1989 and at University of California, Los Angeles from 1989 to 2000. In 2001, Smith returned to Princeton upon being appointed the director of Princeton's African-American studies program. From 2006 to 2009, Smith was the founding director of Princeton's interdisciplinary Center for African American Studies. In July 2011, the university's president appointed Smith the Dean of the college, tasked with "Princeton's undergraduate curriculum, residential college system, and admission and financial aid offices." While at the university as dean, she removed numerical targets for the university's grading policy, expanded socioeconomic diversity, created an international residential college exchange program, and created the Office of Undergraduate Research of Princeton University.

She left Princeton after a 23-year tenure to assume the presidency of Swarthmore College in July 2015; she was inaugurated in October. As president she increased the college's endowment to its 2016 market value of $1.85 billion and started the $450 million fundraising campaign called "Changing Lives, Changing the World" on April 6, 2017.

Early life and education
Valerie Smith was born on February 19, 1956, and raised in Brooklyn, New York. Her father, W. Reeves Smith, was a professor of biology at Long Island University, and her mother, Josephine Smith, a public school teacher; both moved from Charleston, South Carolina to New York. She has said of her time in Brooklyn: "I grew up in a family that really valued knowledge, but also, growing up in Brooklyn, I grew up in an environment where I enjoyed the cultural riches of an urban environment.”

She attended Midwood High School in Brooklyn. At the age of 15, she enrolled at Bates College where she majored in English literature and graduated Phi Beta Kappa, cum laude in 1975. She described her experience at the college as "nurturing" and studied abroad in England at Oxford University. She completed her graduate work at the University of Virginia, eventually earning M.A. and Ph.D. degrees.

Early academic career 
She began teaching at Princeton University in 1980 where she held appointments in the departments of English and African-American studies. After teaching for nine years at Princeton, Smith went to the University of California, Los Angeles, where she was appointed a professor in the English department. Smith along with Emory Elliott, Margaret Doody, and Sandra Gilbert all resigned from Princeton in 1989. The reports suggest that the four were unhappy with the leniency shown to Thomas McFarland after he was accused of sexual misconduct. McFarland was initially put on a one-year suspension, but eventually took early retirement after these resignations and threats of student boycotts. She moved to University of California, Los Angeles that year and was appointed in the English department. While at the University of California, Los Angeles, she served as the Chair of the Interdepartmental Program in African-American Studies and co-director of Cultural Studies in the African Diaspora Project until 2000.

Princeton University 
In 2001, she returned to Princeton where she was the Woodrow Wilson Professor of Literature and Professor of English and African American Studies, as well as the founding director of the Center for African American Studies. A year later she was asked to serve as the director of the university's African American Studies program eventually turning into an academic center in 2006. Smith created a postdoctoral fellows program and established a distinguished visiting scholars program at the academic center. In 2004, she was chosen to give the keynote address for Princeton's observance of Martin Luther King Jr. Day.

In July 2011, it was announced the Smith was to assume the deanship of Princeton College, the undergraduate program of the larger university. She removed numerical targets for the university's grading policy, expanded socioeconomic diversity, created an international residential college exchange program, and created the Office of Undergraduate Research of Princeton University.

On February 21, 2015, Princeton announced that Smith was selected by Swarthmore College as their 15th president. Smith remained at Princeton until June 2015.

Swarthmore College 

In February 2015, the Board of Managers of Swarthmore College unanimously approved Smith as the next president of the college and announced that she would begin her tenure on 1 July 2015. She will also hold appointments in English Literature and Black Studies.

Inauguration 
On October 3, 2015, Smith was inaugurated as the 15th President of Swarthmore College in Swarthmore, Pennsylvania. Her position as the first African-American president drew many of the speakers to discuss the growing racial divides in the U.S. and academia. The president of Brown University at the time, Ruth Simmons, noted that "the long shadow of racial and gender bias still lingers in this society and will influence some of what she will experience on a day to day basis." To a crowd of 1,200, Smith addressed her inauguration by stating:How does greater diversity make us better? Our ability to discover and communicate new knowledge; to find solutions to intractable problems in science and technology, public policy, and the social sciences; and to analyze, contextualize, and express the highest ideals of the human spirit in the humanities and the arts  – these are all enhanced when we earnestly engage with others whose perspectives and experiences differ from our own.

Presidency (2015–present)

Student life 
In late October 2015, Smith adapted the “Dinner with 12 Strangers” program (originally developed at UCLA), which, according to the Swarthmore Daily, "brings members of the campus community together for a meal at the Courtney Smith House." In March 2016, she penned an opinion editorial in the college's newspaper regarding a Letter to the Editor about members of the board of trustees having a conflict of interest in divesting in fossil fuels. The original article requested that "manager[s] having a duality or possible financial conflict of interest on any matter should not use his or her personal influence in the matter and, if a vote were to be taken, should not vote thereon nor be counted even in determining the quorum for the meeting." Smith, along with the Chair of the Managers of Swarthmore College, Tom Spock, issued that "the assertions in the piece [were] unfounded and present[ed] a distorted picture," adding "the administration are united in their deep commitment to climate action." Smith concluded the letter by stating that the college will not divest, citing the "Board’s responsibility to ensure that both current and future generations of Swarthmore students have access to the financial resources," indicating the importance of dependent investments in their long-term financial goals.

Endowment and fundraising 
According to an article by BizJournals, the Swarthmore Endowment Fund, fell by -5% in 2016, indicating a drop from $1.846 billion to $1.747 billion.

On April 6, 2017, Smith announced the "Changing Lives, Changing the World" fundraising campaign intending to raise $450 million.

Academic outreach 
In September 2016, she was profiled by Washington Monthly, where she commented on the minority incarceration debate by rhetorically asking: "How many of the men who are in this facility, or in facilities like it across the country, are there because the educational system failed to engage them intellectually, made them feel unintelligent, less than human?"

On February 17, 2017, Smith was interviewed by Adam Bryant of The New York Times where she outlined the college's market position, incoming students, and her leadership philosophy: "creating an environment within my leadership team where people feel that they can trust each other and feel confident sharing their ideas."

Personal life 
Smith lives in Swarthmore, Pennsylvania. She has served as trustee of her alma mater Bates College (2004-2015), the New Jersey Council for the Humanities, and the McCarter Theater Center.

Awards and honors 
She has been awarded fellowships from the Alphonse G. Fletcher Foundation, the Guggenheim Foundation, and the National Endowment for the Humanities. In 2009, Smith won Princeton's President's Award for Distinguished Teaching. In 2016, she received an honorary Doctor of Letters degree from Hong Kong Baptist University and delivered a distinguished lecture on "Liberal Arts Education: Challenges and Prospects."

She has served on the editorial boards of Women's Studies Quarterly, Criticism, and African American Review.

Selected works
Smith is the author of three monographs: Self-Discovery and Authority in Afro-American Narrative (1987), Not Just Race, Not Just Gender: Black Feminist Readings (1998), and Toni Morrison: Writing the Moral Imagination (2012). She is the editor or co-editor of seven books, and the author of over forty articles.

See also 
 List of Bates College people
 List of University of Virginia people
 List of Swarthmore College people
 History of Princeton University

References

External links 
Official links

Valarie Smith at Swarthmore College
Valerie Smith at Princeton University

News links

Valerie Smith at PhillyVoice.com

Living people
1956 births
Bates College alumni
University of Virginia alumni
Princeton University faculty
University of California, Los Angeles faculty
Presidents of Swarthmore College
Place of birth missing (living people)
Midwood High School alumni
People from Brooklyn
African-American academics
21st-century African-American people
20th-century African-American people